Kristiina Wheeler (born 8 July 1983) is an English-Finnish singer.

Wheeler was born to an English father and a Finnish mother in Hitchin, Hertfordshire, England. The family moved to Tampere, Finland when Kristiina was six years old.

In 2005, Wheeler moved to Helsinki and started to make music. Her first single, "You'll Be Gone", was released in 2005. The song was used in the film Beauty and the Bastard. Her debut album, Hitchin to Helsinki, was released on November 5, 2008.

Television appearances 
In 2007–2008, Wheeler hosted Tilt.tv, a Finnish television program about video games.

In January 2009, Wheeler participated in Kuorosota, the Finnish version of Clash of the Choirs. Her choir was eliminated first.

In 2010, Wheeler participated in the Finnish version of Fort Boyard as part of the Blue team, which won the competition.

In 2013, she announced the Finnish votes in Eurovision 2013, celebrated in Malmö, Sweden.

Discography

Albums 
 Hitchin to Helsinki (2008)
 Sirpaleista koottu (2012)

Singles 
 You'll Be Gone (2005)
 Sunny Day (2008)
 Annie and I (2008)
 Rainy Helsinki (2009)
 Wrong (2009)
 Kiitos kun muistit (2010)
 Ihanaa (2011)
 Sininen sydän (2011)
 Ensimmäinen nainen (2012)
 Muukalainen (2013)
 Rikki (2013)

Music videos 
 Sunny Day (2008 – directed by Misko Iho)
 Annie and I (2008 – directed by Misko Iho)
 Kiitos kun muistit (2010 – directed by Jussi Solja, Heikki Häkkinen, Kristiina Wheeler)
 Ihanaa (2011 – directed by Cristal Snow)
 Sininen sydän (2011 – directed by Cristal Snow)

References

External links 
  

1983 births
Living people
English emigrants to Finland
20th-century Finnish women singers
Finnish pop singers
Finnish television presenters
Finnish women television presenters